A cantarito is a tequila-based highball, paloma-like cocktail, with more ingredients: orange juice, lemon juice, and lime juice, served in a clay cup known as a jarrito de barro that helps keep the drink cold. It can contain ingredients such as lemon juice, lime juice, grapefruit juice, orange juice, sea salt, and grapefruit soda. It is from Jalisco, Mexico.

References

External links
How to Prepare Cantarito Federico Arrizabalaga
Cantarito Pottery Cup

Cocktails with tequila